John Newcombe was the defending champion but he did not take part in the 1972 edition.

Andrés Gimeno won the title, defeating Adriano Panatta in the final 7–5, 9–8, 6–4.

Draw

Final

Section 1

Section 2

References
 1972 Suisse Open draw

Swiss Open (tennis)
1972 Grand Prix (tennis)